Anuța Cătună (born October 1, 1968, in Lunca Ilvei, Bistrița-Năsăud) is a former female long-distance runner from Romania, who represented her native country at two consecutive Summer Olympics, starting in 1996. She won the 1996 edition of the New York City Marathon.  Her personal best time over the distance was 2:26:25 at the World Championships in 1995.

Achievements

References
 
 marathoninfo

1968 births
Living people
People from Bistrița-Năsăud County
Romanian female long-distance runners
Romanian female marathon runners
Olympic athletes of Romania
Athletes (track and field) at the 1996 Summer Olympics
Athletes (track and field) at the 2000 Summer Olympics
World Athletics Championships athletes for Romania
World Athletics Championships medalists
New York City Marathon female winners